Walker Kirtland Hancock (June 28, 1901 – December 30, 1998) was an American sculptor and teacher. He created notable monumental sculptures, including the Pennsylvania Railroad World War II Memorial (1950–52) at 30th Street Station in Philadelphia, and the World War I Soldiers' Memorial (1936–38) in St. Louis, Missouri. He made major additions to the National Cathedral in Washington, D.C., including Christ in Majesty (1972), the bas relief over the High Altar. Works by him are presently housed at the U.S. Military Academy at West Point, the Library of Congress, the U.S. Supreme Court, and the United States Capitol.

During World War II, he was one of the Monuments Men, who recovered art treasures looted by the Nazis. Hancock was awarded the National Medal of Arts in 1989, and the Presidential Medal of Freedom in 1990.

Education and early career

He was born in St. Louis, Missouri, the son of Walter Scott Hancock, a lawyer, and wife Anna Spencer. He had two older sisters and one younger. He attended St. Louis public schools and Central High School. From age 14, he attended Wednesday night and all-day Saturday classes at Washington University's St. Louis School of Fine Arts. He graduated from high school in 1919, and spent the summer taking classes at the University of Wisconsin–Madison. He enrolled at Washington University in the fall, and the following summer worked as an assistant to his teacher, Victor Holm, helping to complete the sculpture program for the Missouri State Monument at Vicksburg National Military Park. In Fall 1920, he transferred to the Pennsylvania Academy of Fine Arts in Philadelphia, Pennsylvania, to study under Charles Grafly.

As a student at PAFA, he won the 1921 Edmund Stewardson Prize, and the 1922 and 1923 Cresson Traveling Scholarships, enabling him to travel through Europe. His Bust of Toivo (1924, Museum of Fine Arts, Boston; Cape Ann Museum, Gloucester, MA) was awarded PAFA's 1925 George D. Widener Memorial Gold Medal.

He won the 1925 Rome Prize, and spent the next 3 years studying at the American Academy in Rome.

A 1929 automobile accident left Grafly gravely injured. On his deathbed, he asked Hancock to succeed him as PAFA's Instructor of Sculpture. Hancock held that position from 1929 to 1967, with interruptions for his war service and two years as sculptor-in-residence at the American Academy in Rome (1956–57).

World War II

Hancock served in the U.S. Army during World War II, and became one of the "Monuments Men", recovering art looted by the Nazis.

Because he spoke fluent Italian, Hancock was recruited into Army intelligence, where he wrote a handbook for soldiers serving in Italy. He won the national competition to design the Air Medal (1942), established by President Franklin D. Roosevelt, to honor "any person who, while serving in any capacity in the Army, Navy, Marine Corps or Coast Guard of the United States subsequent to September 8, 1939, distinguishes, or has distinguished, himself by meritorious achievement while participating in an aerial flight."

On December 4, 1943, three weeks before being shipped overseas, he married Saima Natti (1905–1984) in a chapel at the National Cathedral in Washington, D.C. Later, he would make major additions to the cathedral, including the altarpiece for the Good Shepherd Chapel (1957); half-life-size statues of Ulrich Zwingli (1965) and Martin Luther (1967); Christ in Majesty (1972), the bas relief over the High Altar; and a life-size statue of Abraham Lincoln (1984).

Monuments men
Hancock was posted in London in early 1944, where he researched and wrote reports on monuments and art works in occupied France.

"He was one of 10 officers sent to the continent after D-Day to implement the Allied Expeditionary Force's policy to avoid, wherever military exigency would permit, damage to structures, documents or other items of historical or artistic importance and to prevent further deterioration of those already damaged. With personnel and equipment for this seemingly hopeless task in short supply, Captain Hancock had to rely on his ingenuity, resourcefulness, and extensive knowledge of European cultural history to rescue countless treasures from dampness, fire, weather and the depredations of looters and troops requiring billets."

In May 1945, Walker Hancock set up the first so-called Central Collecting Point in Marburg. Under his leadership, tens of thousands of artworks, books and documents were inventoried and temporarily stored, mainly in the Marburg State Archives. For the photographic documentation, Hancock cooperated with the Bildarchiv Foto Marburg. To protest the "Westward Ho" operation, which took around 200 German-owned paintings to the National Gallery of Art, he resigned from his position in the late fall of 1945 and returned to the United States.

Death
Hancock died in 1998 in Gloucester, Massachusetts.

Works

Zuni Bird Charmer

Hancock's first major commission was the Jessie Tennille Maschmeyer Memorial Fountain (1931–32) for the St. Louis Zoo. A drinking fountain featuring a pedestal flanked by twin basins, the severe Art Deco-Pueblo architecture of its granite base served as inspiration for Hancock's central figure, a Zuni Bird Charmer. The larger-than-life-sized figure of a loin-clothed kneeling man with a bird perched on each wrist, won Hancock PAFA's 1932 Fellowship Prize. The fountain is located beside the east entrance to the zoo's Bird House.

The Spirit of St. Louis
Charles Lindbergh worked as a flight instructor and airmail pilot in St. Louis in the 1920s. On May 20–21, 1927, he piloted a locally-built plane, The Spirit of St. Louis, on the first successful solo non-stop trans-Atlantic flight—from Long Island, New York to Paris, France. This won him the $25,000 Orteig Prize, and made him an international celebrity. Later that year, Lindbergh lent his awards, trophies and memorabilia to the Missouri Historical Society, which exhibited them at the city's Jefferson Memorial Building. Lindberg deeded the collection to the historical society in 1935, and in 1941 commissioned Hancock to create a work honoring those who had sponsored and built The Spirit of St. Louis. Hancock's marble bas-relief plaque – an allegory portraying Louis IX of France (Saint Louis) launching a falcon into flight – was installed at the Missouri History Museum in 1942.

Pennsylvania Railroad World War II Memorial

Perhaps Hancock's most famous work is the Pennsylvania Railroad World War II Memorial (1950–52), at 30th Street Station in Philadelphia, Pennsylvania. The 39-foot (11.9 m) monument is dedicated to the 1,307 PRR employees who died in the war, whose names are listed on bronze panels on its tall, black-granite base. Hancock's heroic bronze, Angel of the Resurrection, depicts Michael the Archangel raising up a fallen soldier from the Flames of War. It was his favorite sculpture.

Stone Mountain

In 1964, Hancock took over supervision of the Confederate Memorial at Stone Mountain, Georgia. The proposed relief carving, the size of a football field, had been begun in 1917 by Gutzon Borglum. Borglum was dismissed in 1925, and replaced by Augustus Lukeman. (Borglum went on to design and carve Mount Rushmore.) No work had been done since 1928. Hancock simplified Lukeman's model, eliminating the horses' lower bodies and legs, and made design adjustments as problems arose with the carving or stone. He modeled towers to flank the carving, but they were never executed due to lack of money. Roy Faulkner completed the carving of the memorial in 1972.

Gethsemane
For Trinity Episcopal Church, Topsfield, Massachusetts, Hancock created an immersive sculpture group, The Garden of Gethsemane (1965–66). On one side of a garden, a kneeling figure of Christ, seen from behind, agonizes about offering himself up for sacrifice, while on the other side his disciples, Peter, James, John, huddle together asleep. The sculpture group was commissioned as a memorial to Jonathan Daniels, an Episcopal seminarian murdered during the Civil Rights Movement. A duplicate of Christ Praying is at Rev. Daniels's alma mater, the Episcopal Divinity School in Cambridge, Massachusetts. A duplicate of the 2-part work is at a Trappist monastery in Kentucky.

List of works

 Fountain sculpture: Dancing Tritons (bronze, 1928–29), Parrish Art Museum (former building), 25 Jobs Lane, Southampton, Long Island, New York.
 Zuni Bird Charmer (bronze, 1931–32), Bird House, St. Louis Zoo, St. Louis, Missouri.
 Pedimental sculpture group: The Bond of Postal Union (limestone, 1934), Pennsylvania Avenue facade, New Post Office Building (now William Jefferson Clinton Federal Building), Washington, D.C. (with Adolph Alexander Weinman).
 5 bas relief busts: Beatty, Foch, Pershing, Diaz, Jacques, (bronze, 1934–35), Liberty Memorial, National World War I Monument, Kansas City, Missouri.
 Architectural sculpture, 5 bas relief panels: The Round Up, First Plowing, Coming of the Railroad, Pioneer Founders, River Traffic (limestone, 1936), north façade, Kansas City City Hall, Kansas City, Missouri.
 4 monumental sculpture groups: Vision, Courage, Sacrifice, Loyalty (granite, 1936–38), Soldiers' Memorial, St. Louis, Missouri.
 Bas relief panel: The Post Rider (marble, 1936–38), West Springfield Post Office, West Springfield, Massachusetts.
 Bust: Piatt Andrew (bronze, 1938), Museum of Franco-American Cooperation, Blérancourt, France. 
 A replica is at American Friends Service Committee Headquarters in New York City.
 Triton Fountain (plaster, 1938–39, destroyed), 1939 New York World's Fair, Flushing, Queens, New York City. 
 A one-third-scale version of one of the triton figures is at Elizabeth Gordon Smith Park, Gloucester, Massachusetts.
 Judge Charles Lincoln Brown (marble, 1940), Philadelphia Municipal Courthouse, 1801 Vine Street, Philadelphia, Pennsylvania.
 Bust: Stephen Collins Foster (bronze, 1941), Hall of Fame for Great Americans, Bronx, New York City.
 Frank P. Brown Medal (bronze, 1941), awarded by the Franklin Institute, Philadelphia, Pennsylvania. 
 Bas relief plaque: The Spirit of St. Louis (marble, 1941–42), Missouri History Museum, St. Louis, Missouri. Hancock's allegory for Charles Lindbergh's 1927 flight across the Atlantic Ocean features Saint Louis (King Louis IX of France) launching the flight of a falcon.
 Air Medal (1942).
 World War II Memorial Tablet (bronze, 1947–49), Central High School, St. Louis, Missouri. Inscription: "Central High School: To Those Who Gave Their Lives For Their Country, 1941–1945."
 Bust: Robert Frost (bronze, 1950), Museum of Fine Arts, Boston, Boston, Massachusetts.
 Angel of the Resurrection (bronze, 1950–52), Pennsylvania Railroad World War II Memorial, 30th Street Station, Philadelphia, Pennsylvania.
 Hancock's one-third-scale plaster model is at the Museum of Fine Arts, Boston.
 President Dwight David Eisenhower Inaugural Medal (gold, 1953), Corcoran Gallery of Art, Washington, D.C. 
 Hancock also created the 1957 inaugural medal, which features profiles of both President Eisenhower and Vice-President Richard M. Nixon.
 John Joseph Eagan (bronze, 1953–55), American Cast Iron Pipe Company, Birmingham, Alabama.
 Relief bust: Andrew W. Mellon (marble, 1954), National Gallery of Art, Washington, D.C.
 Bust: Woodrow Wilson (bronze, 1956), Hall of Fame for Great Americans, Bronx, New York City.
 Bust: Governor Percival P. Baxter (bronze, 1956), Maine State House, Augusta, Maine.
 Bas relief panel: World War II and Korean War Memorial (1957), Loudon County Courthouse, Leesburg, Virginia.
 John Paul Jones (bronze, 1957), William M. Reilly Memorial, Philadelphia Museum of Art Sculpture Garden, Philadelphia, Pennsylvania.
 The Good Shepherd (Istrian stone, 1957), Bowker Memorial Fountain, All Saints Episcopal Church, Worcester, Massachusetts.
 In 1995, Hancock donated a bronze version to St. Mary's Episcopal Church, Rockport, Massachusetts, as a memorial to his wife.
 Architectural sculpture: Three Angels with Palm Branches (limestone, 1959–60), Military Chapel, Lorraine American Cemetery and Memorial, Saint-Avold, France. Carved by M. Juge.
 Vice President Alben W. Barkley (bronze, 1960–63), Kentucky State Capitol, Lexington.
 Paul Weeks Litchfield, (bronze, 1961), Goodyear Tire and Rubber Company, Akron, Ohio.
 Confederate Memorial (granite, 1917–72), Stone Mountain, Georgia. Hancock supervised its completion, 1964-72.
 The Garden of Gethsemane (bronze, 1965–66), Trinity Church, Topsfield, Massachusetts.
 A replica is at The Abbey of Our Lady of Gethsemani, Bardstown, Kentucky.
 A replica of Christ Praying is at the Episcopal Divinity School, Cambridge, Massachusetts.
 Air (bronze, 1978–82), Fairmount Park, Philadelphia, Pennsylvania.
 Arion on a Dolphin (bronze, 1989), Dunn Tower, Methodist Hospital, Houston, Texas.
 Bust: W. E. B. DuBois (marble, 1993), Memorial Hall, Harvard University, Cambridge, Massachusetts.

United States Military Academy (West Point)
 General Douglas MacArthur (bronze, 1969), MacArthur Monument (West Point). A duplicate of this is at the MacArthur Memorial, Norfolk, Virginia.
 Bust: General Leslie R. Groves (bronze, 1975).
 Flight Memorial (bronze, 1992).

Washington National Cathedral
 Christ the Good Shepherd Altarpiece (limestone, 1957), Good Shepherd Chapel. Carved by Roger Morigi.
 Niche figure of Ulrich Zwingli (limestone, 1965). Carved by Roger Morigi.
 Niche figure of Martin Luther (limestone, 1967). Carved by Roger Morigi.
 Christ in Majesty (limestone, 1972), bas relief over the High Altar. Carved by Roger Morigi (with Frank Zic).
 Statue of Abraham Lincoln (bronze, 1984), west end of the Nave.

Library of Congress
 Bust: Stephen Foster (marble, 1951–52), James Madison Memorial Building. Hancock designed the bust in the style of an antebellum sculptor such as Hiram Powers, and carved it in marble himself.
 James Madison (marble, 1974–76), James Madison Memorial Building.

United States Supreme Court Building
 Bust: Chief-Justice Earl Warren (marble, 1977).
 Bust: Chief-Justice Warren E. Burger (marble, 1983). 
 Bronze versions of this are at the National Portrait Gallery, the Minnesota State Capitol, the Swem Library at the College of William and Mary, and elsewhere.

United States Capitol
 Bust: Vice-President Hubert H. Humphrey, Jr. (marble, 1981–82).
 Bust: Vice-President Gerald R. Ford (marble, 1984–85).
 Replicas at Gerald R. Ford Presidential Museum, Grand Rapids, Michigan; Lyndon Baines Johnson Presidential Library, Austin, Texas; and elsewhere.
 Bust: Vice-President George H. W. Bush (marble, 1990–91).

Honors
For his military service, Hancock was awarded the American Campaign Medal, the World War II Victory Medal, and the European-African-Middle Eastern Campaign Medal.

He served as a member of the Smithsonian Institution's National Collection of Fine Arts Commission. He was elected an associate member of the National Academy of Design in 1936, and an academician in 1939. He was inducted into the American Academy of Arts and Letters in 1941. For his body of work, he was awarded the Pennsylvania Academy of the Fine Arts' Medal of Honor in 1953, and the National Sculpture Society's Herbert Adams Medal of Honor in 1954.

In 1971, Hancock received the Golden Plate Award of the American Academy of Achievement.

The U.S. Congress awarded him the National Medal of Arts in 1989. President George H. W. Bush awarded him the Medal of Freedom in 1990.

Legacy
From 1930 onwards, he kept a studio in Gloucester, Massachusetts, to which he ultimately retired. Saima Natti Hancock, his wife of 40 years, died in 1984. The Cape Ann Historical Association mounted a 1989 retrospective exhibition of his works, and published his autobiography, A Sculptor's Fortunes (1997). His work was also part of the sculpture event in the art competition at the 1932 Summer Olympics.

He endowed Massachusetts's Walker Hancock Prize, given for excellence in the arts. The National Sculpture Society has an annual prize named for him. His papers are at the Archives of American Art, Smithsonian Institution, and in the Hancock Family Archives in Gloucester, Massachusetts.

Several of his works can be found at Saint Mary's Episcopal Church, Rockport, Massachusetts. He and his wife are buried at Seaside Cemetery, Gloucester, Massachusetts.

In the 2014 film The Monuments Men, the Sgt. Walter Garfield character played by John Goodman is loosely based on Hancock.

References

Sources
 Walker Hancock, "Experiences of a Monuments Officer in Germany", College Art Journal, 5:4 (May 1946), College Art Association.
 Timothy Crouse & Louise Todd Ambler, The Sculpture of Walker Hancock, exhibition catalogue (Gloucester, MA: Cape Ann Historical Association, 1989): introduction, biographical essay, afterword, checklist of works, 1919-88.
 Walker Hancock, A Sculptor's Fortunes: A Memoir (Gloucester, MA: Cape Ann Historical Association, 1997).
 Susan James-Gadzinski & Mary Mullen Cunningham, "Walker Hancock, b. 1901", American Sculpture in the Museum of American Art of the Pennsylvania Academy of the Fine Arts (PAFA, 1997), pp. 279–85.

External links

 1977 interview with Walker Hancock on his work as a Monuments Man, from Archives of American Art, Smithsonian Institution – (MP3, 24:01)
 
 Photos of Hancock's public art in Philadelphia. Philart.net.
 Stone Mountain Confederate Memorial
 Oral history interview with Walker Hancock at Smithsonian Archives of American Art.
 Obituary, The New York Times, January 2, 1999.
 Obituary, The Washington Post, January 3, 1999.

 

1901 births
1998 deaths
Artists from St. Louis
Sculptors from Pennsylvania
American architectural sculptors
American male sculptors
Pennsylvania Academy of the Fine Arts alumni
Pennsylvania Academy of the Fine Arts faculty
United States National Medal of Arts recipients
Washington University in St. Louis alumni
Saint Louis Zoo people
Monuments men
Presidential Medal of Freedom recipients
Military personnel from St. Louis
United States Army personnel of World War II
20th-century American sculptors
20th-century male artists
Members of the American Academy of Arts and Letters
Sculptors from Missouri
Stone Mountain
Olympic competitors in art competitions
United States Army officers